The variegated pink lemon, also called the variegated Eureka lemon, or pink-fleshed Eureka lemon is a cultivar of lemon (Citrus × limon) with unique pink flesh, a green-striped rind when ripening, and variegated foliage. It was discovered as a sport on an ordinary Eureka lemon tree in Burbank, California, in 1931.

References

External links
 Variegated pink at the Citrus Variety Collection

Lemons